Urban Search and Rescue California Task Force 2 or CA-TF2 is a FEMA Urban Search and Rescue Task Force based in Los Angeles County, California.  CA-TF2 is sponsored by the Los Angeles County Fire Department.

CA-TF2 is one of two Task Forces that works with the United States Agency for International Development’s Office of Foreign Disaster Assistance to provide international response to natural and man-made disasters.

Deployments
 Hurricane Iniki, Kauai, Hawaii
 1994 Northridge earthquake, Los Angeles County, California
 Oklahoma City bombing, Oklahoma City, Oklahoma
 1996 Summer Olympics - Atlanta, Georgia
 2002 Winter Olympics, Salt Lake City, Utah  - Deployed to Utah on standby in the event of a disaster or attack.
 Debris recovery of Space Shuttle Columbia disaster - February 2003.
 2003 Bam earthquake - December 2003
 Southeast Asia tsunami - Sri Lanka
 Hurricane Katrina - Deployed to New Orleans, Louisiana.
 Hurricane Rita - Gulf Region
 2010 Haiti earthquake
 2011 Christchurch earthquake, New Zealand
 2011 Japan earthquake
 April 2015 Nepal earthquake
 2023 Turkey–Syria earthquake

References

External links
 

California 2
Organizations based in Los Angeles County, California